Tsingtao Brewery Co. Ltd. is China's second largest brewery, with about 15% of domestic market share and also accounts for half of China’s national beer exports. It was founded in 1903 by German settlers in Tsingtau (Qingdao), Kiautschou Bay Leased Territory. In 2016, Tsingtao was the second most consumed beer globally and had reached 2.8% share of the global beer market, after its share of the world's beer market had been steadily growing by at least 0.1 percentage points every year since 2009. Its logo displays an image of Huilan Pavilion that stands on the end of Zhanqiao Pier, located on Qingdao's southern shore.

History
Tsingtao Brewery was founded by the Anglo-German Brewery Co. Ltd., an English-German joint stock company based in Hong Kong which owned it until 1916. The brewery sold beers to mainly Europeans in China. The brewery was founded on August 15, 1903 as the Germania-Brauerei (Germania Brewery) with a paid-in capital of 400,000 Mexican silver dollars divided into 4,000 shares priced at $100 each.

Founding members of the Supervisory Board
 John Prentice, of SC Farnham, Boyd & Co., Ltd., Shanghai
 Alexander McLeod, of Gibb, Livingston & Co., Shanghai
 C. W. Wrightson, of Fearon, Daniel & Co., Shanghai
 Max Slevogt, of Slevogt & Co., Shanghai
 J. Jürgen Block, of H. Sietas & Co., Qufu

Brewery Directors
 Heinrich Seifart (1904–November 25, 1907)
 Ernst Siemssen (November 1907 – 1914)

Brewmasters
 R. Schuster (1904–05)
 Martin Wehle (1906–14)

The first beer was served on December 22, 1904.

Following the Siege of Tsingtao during World War I, Tsingtao came under Japanese military control. On August 16, 1916 an extraordinary general meeting was held in Shanghai. Liquidators were appointed and it was decided the company would be sold to the Dai-Nippon Brewery (which in 1949 was split into Asahi Breweries and what later became Sapporo Brewery). The Japanese military administration in Tsingtao approved the liquidation on September 9, 1916. German equity was approximately 70 percent. The German share of the sales price attributable to shareholders was in the hands of the liquidators by April 2, 1921.

Nationalization

After Japan's surrender to the Allies and its retreat from China at the end of World War II, the Tsingtao Brewery was turned into a Chinese brewery under ownership of the Tsui family and supervision of the Nationalist government in Nanjing. However, this period of ownership only lasted until 1949 when, after a civil war, the People's Republic of China was founded. Shortly after, due to Communist policies, all private shares of the Tsingtao Brewery that had previously belonged to the Tsui family were confiscated and the company became a state-owned enterprise.

Privatization
The company was privatized in the early 1990s and in 1993 merged with three other breweries in Qingdao and was finally renamed Tsingtao Brewery Company Limited. At one point 27% of the company was owned by Anheuser-Busch.  The company once owned several other breweries in China, some of which also produced Tsingtao Beer.

On January 23, 2009, Anheuser-Busch InBev announced that it was selling 19.9% to Asahi Breweries for $667 million. The sale will make Asahi Breweries, Ltd. the second largest shareholder in Tsingtao behind only the Tsingtao Brewery Group. On May 9, 2009 Anheuser-Busch InBev sold its remaining 7% to Chinese tycoon Chen Fashu for $235 million.

In January 2017, Asahi Breweries announced that it would sell its 20 percent share in Tsingtao which it had owned since 2009; the value of this share of the company is estimated at US$1.1 billion.

Beers

Tsingtao Beer, a well-hopped standard pale lager of 4.7% abv, is the flagship brew, accounting for most of the brewery's production. An unpasteurized version is sold as Tsingtao Draft Beer.  Tsingtao Beer was long advertized as being "brewed with mineral water from the Laoshan Spring", which contributed to its characteristic flavor, but that now applies only to beer produced in Qingdao, and not to that produced in the company's other breweries.

The brewery also produces a number of other beers, mostly for the local market.  Those sometimes found outside China include Tsingtao Dark Beer (5.2% abv), and more rarely Tsingtao Spirulina Green Beer, also sold as Tsingtao Green Beer, a 4.5% abv green pilsner colored by spirulina and claimed to promote good health.  The alcohol content of export versions may vary slightly from those for the domestic market.

Export orientation

The beer market in China was very underdeveloped in the 1980s and the brewery was forced to concentrate on overseas markets. The Chinese economic reforms in the early 1980s facilitated exportation. However, while concentrating on international markets, the brewery also attempted to sell its beer on the domestic market and competed with other domestic brands as well as foreign brands.

The main export company for the brewery was the "Good Harvest of Five Grains Corporation" based in Hong Kong. The Good Harvest of Five Grains Corporation also tried to market the beer in Hong Kong itself and later built a wholesale network consisting of up to 300 companies.

Tsingtao Beer was introduced to the United States in 1972, and soon became the top-selling Chinese beer in the U.S. market; it has maintained this leadership within the United States ever since, despite increasing competition from other well known Chinese beer brands, Zhujiang and Yanjing. , distribution in the UK and Ireland is handled by C&C Group PLC. The Tsingtao brand is sold in 62 countries and regions around the world, and accounts for more than 50% of China's beer exports. According to the company's financial figures from 2010, Tsingtao saw a 6.6% year-on-year revenue increase from sales to Hong Kong and other overseas markets.

National marketing

Before the 1949 takeover by the new PRC government, the brewery had used imported raw material and water from the Laoshan mountain. With the outbreak of the Korean War and the resulting embargo of the People's Republic by the West, the brewery was forced to use domestic products, and the government encouraged peasants in Shandong to harvest the necessary raw materials (mainly hops and barley) themselves. The government used various incentives, like free seeds, to achieve this goal.

The brewery had previously used nationalistic marketing strategies, and after the switchover to production using only domestic material this nationalist marketing effort was increased. However, the brewery still maintained its international roots.

International Beer Festival
The brewery first applied for permission for a Qingdao International Beer Festival in 1991 and received approval and support from the Qingdao municipal administration, even to the extent that the city became the main sponsor. The first festival was opened on June 23, 1991, and has been held annually ever since. The festival was named "International Beer Festival" to attract foreigners as well as Chinese, although the main purpose of the festival was to make the brand more popular for domestic consumers.

The festival is usually held in late August and lasts for 14 days. During the festival, there are shows in the city and people enjoy many varieties of international beer instead of only Tsingtao. Nowadays the International Beer Festival is not meant simply to publicize the Tsingtao Brewery, but also to encourage the development of Qingdao's beer culture.

See also

 Beer and breweries in China
 List of Chinese companies
 Harbin Beer

References

External links

Tsingtao Beer web site for US
Tsingdao Brewery official website 
Tsingtao Beer UK 

Companies formerly in the Hang Seng China Enterprises Index
Companies listed on the Shanghai Stock Exchange
Breweries in China
Food and drink companies established in 1903
Manufacturing companies based in Qingdao
Buildings and structures in Qingdao
Asahi Breweries
Chinese beer brands
Major National Historical and Cultural Sites in Shandong
Tourist attractions in Qingdao